Bisphams Mill Creek is a  tributary of Greenwood Branch in the southern New Jersey Pine Barrens in the United States.

See also
List of rivers of New Jersey

References

Rivers in the Pine Barrens (New Jersey)
Rivers of New Jersey
Tributaries of Rancocas Creek